The Holt School is a secondary school located on the outskirts of Wokingham, Berkshire, England, on Holt Lane. It is a girls' school and currently teaches over 1,200 girls ranging from age 11–18. Boys are admitted to the sixth form. There are eight houses: Broderers, Clothworkers, Goldsmiths, Haberdashers, Lacemakers, Spinners, Tanners and Weavers.

The school was founded in 1931, originally at Tudor House, and its first headmistress was G. M. Brown. It is a specialized language and science college and is in the top 100 highest achieving schools in GCSE, AS and A level exam results. The current co-headteachers are Anne Kennedy and Katie Pearce.

In June 2020, James Furlong, a 36-year-old teacher who was head of history, government, and politics at the school, was stabbed to death in the 2020 Forbury Gardens stabbings in Reading.

Notable alumni 
 Bonita Norris (born 1987), youngest British female to climb Mount Everest
 Celia Wade-Brown (born 1956), Mayor of Wellington, New Zealand

References

External links
 Official website

Academies in the Borough of Wokingham
Educational institutions established in 1931
Secondary schools in the Borough of Wokingham
1931 establishments in England